Nicholas Kadi (born Nameer El-Kadi; September 22, 1952) is an Iraqi–American actor.

Kadi was born in Istanbul, Turkey. His father, Nizar el Kadi, was an Iraqi ambassador.

Kadi has appeared in numerous television sitcoms and series, such as JAG, Sleeper Cell, Alias, 24, ER, The Young and the Restless and The Wayans Bros. He is fluent in Arabic and French. He co-starred in the Academy Award winning movie "Quest For Fire".

According to the commentary by Rae Dawn Chong and Ron Perlman on the La Guerre du Feu DVD (1981), Kadi met his wife on the set of the film (she was an on-set nurse in Scotland) and Perlman is the godfather to their daughter.

He is the twin brother of Naseer El-Kadi.

Filmography
 Glee (appearance) (2014)
 Oranges (2008)
 Clear Cut, Simple (2007)
 Soldier of God (2005)
 Cold Winter (2005)
 Muhammad: The Last Prophet (2002)
 Freedom Strike (1998)
 Ballad of the Nightingale (1998)
 George of the Jungle (1997)
 Congo (1995)
 Me, Myself and I (1992)
 Navy SEALS (1990)
 La Guerre du Feu (Quest for Fire) (1981)

References

External links 

1952 births
American male film actors
American people of Turkish descent
Iraqi male film actors
Iraqi emigrants to the United States
Living people
Iraqi expatriates in Turkey
Male actors from Istanbul
20th-century American male actors
21st-century American male actors
20th-century Iraqi male actors
21st-century Iraqi male actors